The Champeen is the seventh Our Gang short subject comedy released. The Our Gang series (later known as "The Little Rascals") was created by Hal Roach in 1922, and continued production until 1944.

Plot
After getting caught for stealing apples, Sammy starts to promote boxing matches to pay back the grocer. 
Mickey and Jack challenge each other in a match, with each hoping to gain the affection of Mary Kornman.

Notes
When the television rights for the original silent Pathé Our Gang comedies were sold to National Telepix and other distributors, several episodes were retitled. This film was released into TV syndication as Mischief Makers in 1960 under the title "Big Fight". About two-thirds of the original film was included. The scene where Mickey and Tuffy race to get sodas for Mary was included in the hybrid Mischief Makers episode "Play Ball!". This short was remade as a part-talking film, Boxing Gloves, in 1929, with Joe Cobb and Chubby Chaney fighting over the affections of Jean Darling, and Farina as the promoter and referee.

Cast

The Gang
 Jackie Condon as Jackie
 Mickey Daniels as Mickey
 Jack Davis as Jackie 'Tuffy'
 Ernie Morrison as Sammy
 Mary Kornman as Mary
 Allen Hoskins as Farina
 Richard Billings as Tuffy's first trainer
 Dorothy Morrison as Farina's opponent
 Gabe Saienz as Komp
 Andy Samuel as Mickey's second trainer
 George "Freckles" Warde as Mickey's first trainer
 Dinah the Mule as herself

Additional cast
 Elmo Billings as Audience member
 Joe Cobb as Audience member
 Sammy Brooks as The green grocer
 Wallace Howe as The smoker
 Charles Stevenson as The police officer

External links 
 
 
 

1923 films
Hal Roach Studios short films
American silent short films
American black-and-white films
Films directed by Robert F. McGowan
1923 comedy films
Our Gang films
Films with screenplays by H. M. Walker
1923 short films
1920s American films
Silent American comedy films